Qianball is a racket sport similar to tennis or squash. The sport  originated from Chinese Qianlongball, and was popularized in Denmark with their own organization, the KFUM.The game can be described as a mixture between tennis and squash or as squash without walls. The game can be played by two or four players, or by a single person practicing. Qianball can be played on any flat hard surface, indoors or outdoors, no matter the weather. 

The game is played on a court a little smaller than a tennis court with both players placed on the same side of the net. The player side of the net measures 7.6 * 7.8 m, and the other side of the net should be app. 10 * 12 m, but there are no exact rules for this.   

The game involves:

One court measuring 7.6 by 7.8 meters in the player zone and 10 by 12 meters in the ball zone
Two or four players playing respectively single or double
One ballbag with weight or floor embedded hook
A qianball racket for each player
A qianball ball with rubber band
A net or similar at a height of 81 cm

The game is played by placing the ball bag 2.1 metres from the net in the so-called Qianball point. The end of the rubber band is attached to the turning rings or the floor embedded hook. 
The players are positioned on the same side of the net as in squash and they take turns to serve 2 consecutive serves before changing sides. The game is decided in three sets to 15, playing with a running score. 

The ball may not touch the ground in the player zone or the opposing player will score a point, and may only touch the ground once in the ball zone.
 
Denmark was the first country in Europe where Qianball came to from China. In Denmark the game is organised under KFUM (Danish branch of YMCA sport). In China there are roughly one million players.

Racket sports
Forms of tennis
Sports originating in China